The Jacksons is an American variety show featuring the Jackson siblings (except for Jermaine, who was signed to Motown while the Jackson group was signed to the Epic/CBS record label). It was the first variety show where the entire cast were siblings or an African-American family. The thirty-minute Wednesday evening show began airing on CBS as a summer 1976 show and it continued into the 1976–1977 season, finishing on March 9, 1977 after running for 12 episodes.

As with the Jackson 5 regular performances, Michael Jackson was the lead performer in musical and dance performances. Despite the public acclaim following the early episodes, he was not enthusiastic with the overall project, later calling it "a dumb move" and adding he "hated every minute of it".

Cast
Rebbie Jackson
Jackie Jackson
Tito Jackson
La Toya Jackson
Marlon Jackson
Michael Jackson
Randy Jackson
Janet Jackson

Episodes

Notes

External links
 

1976 American television series debuts
1977 American television series endings
1970s American variety television series
1970s American sketch comedy television series
CBS original programming
English-language television shows
The Jackson 5
Television series by CBS Studios